José Cândido de Campos (born 22 November 1941), known as Brandão, is a Brazilian footballer. He competed in the men's tournament at the 1960 Summer Olympics.

References

External links
 

1941 births
Living people
Brazilian footballers
Brazil international footballers
Olympic footballers of Brazil
Footballers at the 1960 Summer Olympics
Footballers from São Paulo
Association football midfielders
Santos FC players